Gloria Mas (born 6 December 1960) is a Spanish former competitive figure skater. She competed in the ladies' singles event at the 1980 Winter Olympics.

References

External links
 

1960 births
Living people
Spanish female single skaters
Olympic figure skaters of Spain
Figure skaters at the 1980 Winter Olympics
Sportspeople from Barcelona